

Events 
 January–March 
 January 7 – The first American commercial bank (Bank of North America) opens.
 January 15 – Superintendent of Finance Robert Morris goes before the United States Congress to recommend establishment of a national mint and decimal coinage.
 January 23 – The Laird of Johnstone (George Ludovic Houston) invites people to buy marked plots of land which, when built upon, form the planned town of Johnstone, Scotland, to provide employment for his thread and cotton mills.
 February 5 – The Spanish defeat British forces and capture Menorca.
 February 6 – Singu Min is overthrown as king of Myanmar by his cousin Phaungka Min and 8 days later will be executed by his uncle Bodawpayar.
 February 18 – Fourth Anglo-Dutch War: Shirley's Gold Coast expedition lands at Elmina on the Dutch Gold Coast. The British expedition fails to take the fort here but over the next several weeks seizes, with minimal resistance, four small Dutch forts.
 February 27 – The British House of Commons votes against further war in America, paving the way for the Second Rockingham ministry and the Peace of Paris.
 March 8 – Gnadenhutten massacre: In Ohio, 29 Native American men, 27 women, and 34 children are killed by colonial militiamen in retaliation for raids carried out by another Native American group.
 March 14 – Battle of Wuchale: Emperor Tekle Giyorgis pacifies a group of Oromo near Wuchale.
 March 27 – Charles Watson-Wentworth, 2nd Marquess of Rockingham becomes Prime Minister of the United Kingdom.
 March 31 (Easter Sunday) – Mission San Buenaventura is founded in Las Californias, part of the Viceroyalty of New Spain.

 April–June 
 April 6 – Rama I overthrows King Taksin of Siam (now Thailand) in a coup d'état, and moves the political capital from Thonburi, across the Chao Phraya River to Rattanakosin Island, the historic center of Bangkok.

 April 12 – Battle of the Saintes: A British fleet under Admiral Sir George Rodney defeats a French fleet under the Comte de Grasse, in the West Indies.
 April 19 – John Adams secures recognition of the United States as an independent government by the Dutch Republic. During this visit, he also negotiates a loan of five million guilders, financed by Nicolaas van Staphorst and Wilhelm Willink.
 April 21 – A Lak Mueang (city pillar) is erected on Rattanakosin Island, located on the eastern bank of the Chao Phraya River, by order of King Rama I, an act considered the founding of the capital city of Bangkok.
 May 17 – The Parliament of Great Britain passes the Repeal of Act for Securing Dependence of Ireland Act, a major component of the reforms collectively known as the Constitution of 1782, which restore legislative independence to the Parliament of Ireland.
 June 18 – In Switzerland, Anna Göldi is sentenced to death for witchcraft (the last legal witchcraft sentence).
 June 20 – The bald eagle is chosen as the emblem of the United States of America.  On the same day, the Confederation Congress adopts the design for the Great Seal of the United States.

 July–September 
 July – Joseph II, Holy Roman Emperor, receives a visit from Pope Pius VI.
 July 1 – Raid on Lunenburg: American privateers attack the British settlement at Lunenburg, Nova Scotia.
 July 16–August 29 – The Masonic Congress of Wilhelmsbad, Germany, one of history's most important ever secret society congresses, takes place. High-degree Freemasons from the whole of Europe spend the time deliberating the fate of the rite of Strict Observance, and hierarchy of the governing bodies of world Freemasonry, at the Hanau-Wilhelmsbad spa.
 July 16 – Wolfgang Amadeus Mozart's opera Die Entführung aus dem Serail premieres at the Burgtheater in Vienna.
 August 7
 George Washington orders the creation of the Badge of Military Merit (or the Order of the Purple Heart) to honor soldiers' merit in battle (reinstated later by Franklin D. Roosevelt, and renamed to the more poetic "Purple Heart", to honor soldiers wounded in action).
 Étienne Maurice Falconet's Bronze Horseman statue of Tsar Peter the Great is unveiled in Saint Petersburg.
 August 21 – A fire breaks out in Constantinople at 9:00 in the evening and burns for two and a half days, destroying thousands of buildings and one-half of the city, and killing hundreds of people.
 September 7 – Corresponds to the Jewish Calendar, 5543.
 September 17 – 1782 Central Atlantic hurricane devastates a British Royal Navy fleet off the Grand Banks of Newfoundland with the loss of 3,500 lives.

 October–December 
 October 10 – Welsh actress Sarah Siddons, the pre-eminent star of the English stage, makes a triumphant return to the theatre in the title role of David Garrick's new play, Isabella, or The Fatal Marriage.
 October 18
 The first franking privilege is granted for official correspondence to be sent at no charge to and from members of the Confederation Congress, at government expense, during periods when the Congress is in session.
 John Adams returns to Paris as the first United States Minister to France.
 November 4 – Elias Boudinot of New Jersey is elected the new President of the Congress of the Confederation.
 November 30 – American Revolutionary War: In Paris, representatives from the United States and the Kingdom of Great Britain sign preliminary peace articles (later formalized in the Treaty of Paris).
 December 12 – American Revolutionary War: Action of 12 December 1782: A naval engagement off Ferrol, Spain, in which the British ship  commanded by James Luttrell successfully attacks a convoy of French and American ships attempting to supply the United States.
 December 16 – East India Company: Hada and Mada Miah lead a rebellion in the Indian subcontinent against East India Company officer Robert Lindsay and his troops in Sylhet Shahi Eidgah.
 Date unknown 
 Chief Kamehameha I of Hawaii gains control of the northern part of the island of Hawaii, after defeating his cousin Kīwalaʻō.
 Princess Yekaterina Vorontsova-Dashkova is the first woman in the world to direct a scientific academy, the Imperial Academy of Arts and Sciences.
 London creates the Foot Patrol for public security.
 The British Parliament extends James Watt's patent for the steam engine to the year 1800.
 The North Carolina General Assembly incorporates Washington, North Carolina.
 In China, the Siku Quanshu is completed, the largest literary compilation in China's history (surpassing the Yongle Encyclopedia of the 15th century). The books are bound in 36,381 volumes (册) with more than 79,000 chapters (卷), comprising about 2.3 million pages, and approximately 800 million Chinese characters.
 The first theater in the Baltic, the Riga City Theater, is founded.
 Saint Petersburg, Russia has 300,000 inhabitants.

Births 
 January 5 – Robert Morrison, Scottish Protestant missionary to China (d. 1834)
 January 18 – Daniel Webster, American statesman (d. 1852)
 January 22 – Philip Hamilton, son of American Founding Father, Alexander Hamilton (d. 1801)
 January 27 – Titumir, Bengali revolutionary (d. 1831)
 February 15 – William Miller, American preacher (d. 1849)
 March 4 – Johann Rudolf Wyss, Swiss writer (d. 1830)
 April 7 – Marie-Anne Libert, Belgian botanist (d. 1865) 
 April 10 – María Antonia Santos Plata, Neogranadine rebel leader, heroine (d. 1819) 
 April 21 – Friedrich Fröbel, German pedagogue (d. 1852)
 April 26 – Maria Amalia of Naples and Sicily, Queen of France (d. 1866)
 July 3 – Pierre Berthier, French geologist (d. 1861)
 July 26 – John Field, Irish composer (d. 1837)
 August 10 – Vicente Guerrero, 2nd President of Mexico (d. 1831)
 September 16 – Daoguang Emperor, Chinese emperor (d. 1850)
 September 25 – Charles Maturin, Irish writer (d. 1824)
 October 9 – Lewis Cass, American military officer, politician, and statesman (d. 1866)
 October 27 – Nicolò Paganini, Italian violinist and composer (d. 1840)
 November 1 – F. J. Robinson, 1st Viscount Goderich, Prime Minister of the United Kingdom (d. 1859)
 December 5 – Martin Van Buren, eighth President of the United States (d. 1862)
 December 23 – William Armstrong, American lawyer, civil servant, politician, and businessperson (d. 1865)

Deaths 

 January 2 – Johann Christian Bach, German composer (b. 1735)
 January 4 – Ange-Jacques Gabriel, French architect (b. 1698)
 January 18 – John Pringle, Scottish physician (b. 1707)
 January 30 – Vasily Dolgorukov-Krymsky, Russian general (b. 1722)
 February 9 – Giuseppe Luigi Assemani, Syrian orientalist (b. 1710)
 February 10 – Friedrich Christoph Oetinger, German theologian (b. 1702)
 March 1 – John A. Treutlen, Governor of Georgia (b. 1734)
 March 9 – Sava II Petrović-Njegoš, Metropolitan of Cetinje (b. 1702)
 March 17 – Daniel Bernoulli, Dutch-born mathematical physicist (b. 1700)
 April 7 – Taksin the Great, King of Siam (Thonburi Kingdom) (b. 1734)
 April 13 – Metastasio, Italian poet, librettist (b. 1698)
 April 17 – Baal Shem of London, British Kabbalist (b. 1708)
 April 22 – Josef Seger, Czech composer and organist (b. 1716)
 April 28 – William Talbot, 1st Earl Talbot, English politician (b. 1710)
 May 8 – Sebastião José de Carvalho e Melo, 1st Marquis of Pombal, Portuguese statesman (b. 1699)
 May 15 – Richard Wilson, British painter (b. 1714)
 May 16 – Daniel Solander, Swedish botanist (b. 1736)
 May 20 – William Emerson, English mathematician (b. 1701)
 May 22 – Princess Friederike of Hesse-Darmstadt (b. 1752)
 June 11 – William Crawford, American soldier and surveyor (burned at the stake by Native Americans) (b. 1732)
 June 18 – John Wood, the Younger, English architect (b. 1728)
 June 21 – Prince George William of Hesse-Darmstadt, German prince (b. 1722)
 July 1 – Charles Watson-Wentworth, 2nd Marquess of Rockingham, British statesman, 2-time Prime Minister of the United Kingdom (b. 1730)
 July 15 – Farinelli, Italian castrato (b. 1705)
 August 27 – John Laurens, American soldier (b. 1754)
 August 31 – George Croghan, American colonist
 September 5 – Bartolina Sisa, Bolivian indigenous Aymara heroine, rebel leader 
 September 6
 Gregoria Apaza, Bolivian indigenous leader (b. 1751)
 Martha Wayles Skelton Jefferson, wife of Thomas Jefferson (b. 1748)
 September 14 – Nicholas Cooke, first Governor of Rhode Island (b. 1717)
 October 2 – Charles Lee, Continental Army general during the American War of Independence (b. 1732)
 November 5 – James Burrow, British scholar (b. 1701)
 November 21 – Jacques de Vaucanson, French inventor (b. 1709)
 December 7 – Hyder Ali, Indian general, Sultan of Mysore (b. 1720)
 December 16 – William Cole (antiquary), British antiquarian (b. 1714)
 December 27 – Henry Home, Lord Kames, Scottish advocate and philosopher (b. 1697)
 date unknown
 Christine Kirch, German astronomer (b. 1696)
 Sabina Aufenwerth, German potter (b. 1706)
 Elisabeth Christina von Linné, Swedish botanist (b. 1743)

References

Further reading